Ohemaa Mercy is a Ghanaian contemporary gospel singer with several awards to her name.

Early life and education

Mercy Amoah popularly known as Ohemaa Mercy was born in Weija, Accra to Fantis parents, Mr and Mrs Amoah, from Abakrapa and Elmina respectively. She lived most of her young life in Koforidua. Ohemaa Mercy undertook her primary education at St. Peter's Anglican Primary School, Koforidua and secondary education at Ghana Senior High School, Koforidua. She continued to the S.D.A Teachers Training College, Asokore, Koforidua where she obtained her Teachers Certificate ‘A'.

Music career

Ohemaa Mercy released her first album in the latter part of November 2004. Entitled Adamfo Papa, the album enjoyed massive airplay after its release, which brought Ohemaa into the limelight. She won seven nominations for the 2006 Ghana Music Awards but did not win any of the awards. She later won the Discovery of the year for the Gospel Music Awards the same year.

In 2007, the gospel minister released her second album, Edin Jesus. Ohemaa Mercy sold 875,000 copies six months after releasing the second album making it the best-selling album of the year.

The Edin Jesus album gave Ohemaa Mercy 10 nominations for the 2008 Ghana Music Awards. This was the highest number of nominations so far in the history of the awards scheme. At the event she managed to take home three awards: Gospel Artiste of the Year, Album of the Year and Gospel Album of The Year. In the same year she won a Grand Medal During the National Honours Award from the ex-President of Ghana, John Kufuor.

In 2010–11 Ohemaa released her third album, Wobeye Kese, which again was the highest selling album and topped all the major chat shows in the country.

Four months after its release this album again won her four nominations at the 2014 Ghana Music Awards.

She won the Gospel Artiste of the year and in Canada the same year was Gospel Artiste of the Year-Canada. She was nominated the Best Female Artiste West Africa the same year for the Africa Gospel Music awards in London.
She also won Vodafone Ghana Music Awards 23 "Gospel Song Of The Year" with Ote Me Mu ft MOG music 
Ohemaa Mercy has performed on major platforms with electrifying performances that have earned her a huge fun base, not only for the love of her music but also for her stage performances.

Studio albums

Major singles

 "Aseda" (Thanksgiving)
 "We Praise Your Name"
 "Yesu Mogya" (The Blood of Jesus)
 "Woafiri Mu"(You Have Escaped It)
 "Ɔbɛyɛ Ama Wo"(He Will Do It For You)
 "Biribi Bɛsi"(Something Will Happen)
"Ote Me Mu" ft. MOG Music

Awards and nominations

References

External links
OHEMAA MERCY on Facebook
OHEMAA MERCY on Twitter
OHEMAA MERCY on website

Living people
1977 births
People from Accra
People from Koforidua
Ghanaian gospel singers
Ghanaian Christians
21st-century Ghanaian women singers
21st-century Ghanaian singers
Ghana Senior High School (Koforidua) alumni